Vinegar Bend is an unincorporated census-designated place in Washington County, Alabama, United States. As of the 2010 census, its population was 192. Vinegar Bend had a post office with ZIP code 36584 until it was closed July 1, 2010. When the bridge on the "main" road into Vinegar Bend was closed for repairs, the USPS closed the post office for good.

History
There are a number of stories about how Vinegar Bend got its name.  One is that it received its name when a container holding vinegar burst at the freight station near the river's bend. It has frequently been noted on lists of unusual place names.

Lucius Beebe visited Vinegar Bend in the 1940s and wrote "Vinegar Bend itself is a communal last chapter.  Once at the turn of the century, a local ancient told us, it had been a hustling township boasting a huge planing mill, numerous stores and residences and a forty-two-room-hotel.  The railroad had owned half a dozen engines, each one smokier and more pyrotechnic than the next, and life had gone on at a giddy pace."

Demographics

As of the 2010 United States Census, there were 192 people living in the CDP. The racial makeup of the CDP was 79.2% Black, 15.1% White, 2.6% Native American, 0.5% Asian and 2.6% from two or more races.

Notable person
Wilmer "Vinegar Bend" Mizell, Major League Baseball pitcher and U.S. Congressman from North Carolina, was born across the state line in Mississippi, but the family's residence was on the Vinegar Bend mail route, therefore Vinegar Bend was recorded as his birthplace and he was nicknamed for the community.

References

Census-designated places in Washington County, Alabama
Census-designated places in Alabama